Hants—Kings was a federal electoral district in the province of Nova Scotia, Canada, that was represented in the House of Commons of Canada from 1925 to 1935.

This riding was created in 1924 from Hants and Kings ridings.  It consisted of the Counties of Hants and Kings. It was abolished in 1933 when it was redistributed into Colchester—Hants and Digby—Annapolis—Kings ridings.

Members of Parliament

This riding elected the following Members of Parliament:

Election results

See also 

 List of Canadian federal electoral districts
 Past Canadian electoral districts

External links 
 Riding history for Hants—Kings (1924–1933) from the Library of Parliament

Former federal electoral districts of Nova Scotia